20th Century Hits is a remix album of recordings by Boney M. released by BMG in 1999. This remix project which was credited as 'Boney M. 2000' spun off a series of new single releases; "Ma Baker – Somebody Scream" in early 1999 and previously included on French compilation Ultimate,  "Daddy Cool '99" featuring Mobi T., "Caribbean Night Fever / Hooray! Hooray! It's A Holi-Holiday" and "Sunny".

Track listing

Personnel
 Liz Mitchell – lead vocals, backing vocals
 Marcia Barrett – lead vocals, backing vocals
 Frank Farian – lead vocals, backing vocals
 Reggie Tsiboe – lead vocals, backing vocals (track 11)
 Keith Forsey – drums
 Curt Cress – drums
 Todd Canedy – drums
 Gary Unwinn – bass guitar
 Dave King – bass
 Dieter Petereit – bass
 Nick Woodland – guitars
 Mats Björklund – guitars
 Johan Daansen – guitars
 Michael Cretu – keyboards
 Kristian Schultze – keyboards
 Harry Baierl – keyboards
 Sylvester Levay – keyboards
 Thor Baldursson – keyboards
 Christoph Seipel – keyboards
 Domenico Livrano – keyboards
 Dino Solera – saxophone
 Benny Gebauer – sax
 Felice Civitareale – trumpet

Production
 Frank Farian – producer, remixer
 Tokapi – producer
 Sash! – remixers
 Doug Laurent – remixer
 Nouri – remixer
 Marek – remixer
 Zeke Lund – sound engineer
 Hartmut Pfannmüller – engineer
 Tammy Grohé – engineer
 Rainer M. Ehrnhardt – engineer
 Michael Bestmann – engineer
 Bernd Berwanger – engineer
 Tobias Freud – engineer
 Helmut Rulofs – engineer
 Michael Cretu – arranger
 Stefan Klinkhammer – arranger
 Harry Baierl – arranger

Single releases
UK

12"

 Boney M. vs. Horny United "Ma Baker/Somebody Scream" (Logic Records 74321 65387 1, 1999)
Side A
 "Ma Baker (Club Mix by Horny United)
Side B   
 "Somebody Scream" (Beatroute Star Bar Mix by DJ Slammer & Mark Bambach)
 "Somebody Scream" (Cosmic People Mix)

CD

 Boney M. vs. Horny United "Ma Baker/Somebody Scream" (Logic Records 74321 65387 2, 1999)
 "Somebody Scream" (Radio Edit) – 3:06
 "Ma Baker" (Sash! Radio Edit) – 3:27
 "Somebody Scream" (Massive Club mix) – 7:31
 "Ma Baker" (Sash! 12" Mix) – 4:55

EU

12"
 Boney M. / Horny United Feat. Boney M. – "Ma Baker" / "Somebody Scream – Ma Baker" (2 x 12", Logic Records/Lautstark/BMG 74321 64561 1, 1999)
Side A
 Boney M. "Ma Baker" (Extended Vocal Edit) – 5:26
Side B 
 Boney M.  "Ma Baker" (Disco Dub Edit) – 5:35
Side C
 Horny United  "Somebody Scream – Ma Baker" (Massive Mix) – 7:30
 Horny United  "Somebody Scream – Ma Baker" (Screamless Mix) – 6:16
Side D
 Horny United  "Somebody Scream – Ma Baker" (Full Vocal Mix)
 Horny United  "Somebody Scream – Ma Baker" (Ma Baker House Mix)
CD

 Boney M vs. Sash!: "Ma Baker" (BMG 74321 63942 2, 1998)
 "Ma Baker (Tokapi Radio Edit) – 3:24
 "Ma Baker" (Original Edit) – 3:35
 "Ma Baker" (Extended Vocal Edit) – 5:26
 "Ma Baker" (Disco Dub Edit) – 5:35

 Boney M. vs. Sash!/Horny United Featuring Boney M.: "Ma Baker"/"Somebody Scream" (BMG 74321 64561 2, 1999)
 Boney M. vs. Sash!  "Ma Baker" (Extended Radio Edit) – 4:54
 Boney M. vs. Sash!  "Ma Baker" (Disco Dub Edit) (5:32)
 Horny United Featuring Boney M.  "Somebody Scream (Ma Baker)" (Radio Edit) (Oliver Wallner, Re-Run) – 4:17
 Horny United Featuring Boney M.  "Somebody Scream (Ma Baker)" (Massive Mix) (Oliver Wallner, Re-Run) – 6:59

 Boney M. 2000 Featuring Mobi T.: "Daddy Cool '99" (BMG 74321 69177 2, 1999)
 "Daddy Cool '99" (Radio Edit) – 3:51
 "Daddy Cool '99" (Extended Vocal Club Mix) – 5:06
 "Daddy Cool '99" (Latino Club Mix) – 3:33
 "Daddy Cool '99" (Solid Disco Edit) – 3:45
 "Daddy Cool" (Original Mix 1976) – 3:26

 Boney M. 2000: "Hooray! Hooray! (Caribbean Night Fever)" (BMG 74321 71064 2, 1999)
 "Caribbean Night Fever – Megamix" (Radio Edit) – 3:55
 "Hooray! Hooray! It's a Holi-Holiday" (Radio Edit) – 3:30
 "Caribbean Night Fever" (Extended Version) – 5:28
 "Hooray! Hooray! It's a Holi-Holiday" (Extended Version) – 4:26
 "Brown Girl in the Ring" (Remix) – 4:01

 Boney M. 2000: "Sunny (Remixes)" (BMG 74321 73824 2, 2000)
 "Sunny" (Radio Edit) – 3:31
 "Sunny" (Radio Remix – Disco Club) – 3:35
 "Sunny" (Extended Version) – 4:47
 "Sunny" (Disco Club Mix) – 5:46
 "Sunny" (Club Mix) – 4:45
 "Sunny" (House Mix) – 4:55
 "Sunny" (London Vocal Mix) – 3:34
 "Sunny" (Space Mix) – 4:51

Certifications

Sources and external links
 Rate Your Music, detailed discography
 Discogs.com, detailed discography
 [ Allmusic, biography, discography etc.]

References

Albums produced by Frank Farian
1999 remix albums
Boney M. remix albums
Bertelsmann Music Group remix albums